This is a list of Nigerian films released in 2023.

2023

January–March

April–June

July–September

October–December

See also 

 2023 in Nigeria
 List of Nigerian films

References 

2023
Nigeria